Anisembia is a genus of webspinners in the family Anisembiidae. There is at least one described species in Anisembia, A. texana, discovered by Krauss in 1911.

References

Further reading

 

Embioptera
Articles created by Qbugbot